Léon Kengo wa Dondo (born Leon Lubicz; 22 May 1935) is a Congolese politician who served as the "first state commissioner" (a title equivalent to prime minister) several times under Mobutu Sese Seko in Zaïre. He served as President of the Senate of the Democratic Republic of the Congo from 2007 to 2019.

Early life 
Kengo was born in Libenge, Équateur province, Belgian Congo (later Zaire and now Democratic Republic of Congo). He was the son of a Polish Jewish father and a Rwandan Tutsi mother. He changed his name to Kengo wa Dondo in 1971 during Mobutu's Africanization (Authenticité) campaign.

Career 
On 11 April 1968 Kengo was appointed Procureur Général of the Kinshasa Court of Appeal. On 14 August he was promoted to Procureur Général of the Supreme Court of Justice of the Democratic Republic of the Congo. In 1974 a new constitution was promulgated that changed the Congo's name to Zaire and concentrated the government's authority in Mobutu Sese Seko as President. Kengo, as one of the country's senior-most magistrates, supported the independence of the judiciary and, despite Mobutu's centralisation, interpreted the document as only veiling such autonomy, not eliminating it. He argued that the Judicial Council of the Mouvement Populaire de la Révolution, the state party, was the most independent branch in comparison to its counterparts. He also said that a magistrate's prerogative to construe law was "a breach in the plenary powers exercised by the President."

Prime Minister of Mobutu 
After serving as his country's ambassador to Belgium, Kengo served as Prime Minister for the first time from 1982 to 1986, appointing able technocrats to important positions, such as Munga Mibindo, President Delegate General of the National Electrical Utility. He then served as foreign minister from 1986 to 1987 and as Prime Minister again from 1988 to 1990. During the early 1990s Mobutu allowed a transitional parliament to be set up, and Kengo was chosen Prime Minister by it in 1994 as a candidate in an attempt to neutralise the challenge from the popular opposition politician Étienne Tshisekedi. He expelled members of the Lebanese community from Zaire for alleged involvement in the illegal trade of conflict diamonds, though the credibility of such actions is perhaps challenged by the fact that trade in conflict diamonds from Angola had long been essential to the survival of the Mobutu regime, in which Kengo had been such an important figure.

Shortly after the beginning of the Congo civil war, in December 1996, Kengo became the leader of a crisis cabinet which sought to defeat the rebellion of Laurent Kabila. He was undermined by many Mobutu supporters because of his Tutsi origins, as Kabila's rebels were allied with the Tutsi governments of Rwanda and Burundi. As Kabila's armies advanced through the country, Kengo was also criticized for not conducting the war very well. He announced his resignation in March 1997 and left office in April 1997. The Mobutu government fell a month later, and Kengo retired from politics. In 2003, he was charged with money laundering in Belgium.

President of the Senate of Congo 

Following his return to the Democratic Republic of the Congo, Kengo backed Jean-Pierre Bemba in the 2006 presidential election; Bemba was defeated by President Joseph Kabila in the second round of the election. Kengo was then elected as a Senator from Équateur province in January 2007. On 11 May 2007, Kengo was somewhat unexpectedly elected as President of the Senate, defeating Léonard She Okitundu, the candidate of the majority coalition, the Alliance of the Presidential Majority. Kengo, who was an independent candidate, took 55 votes against 49 for Okitundu. On 21 January 2015 during the 2015 Congolese protests he met with American, Belgian, British and French diplomats who urged him to either suspend debate and voting on the election modifying law or to remove its controversial provisions. He served as Senate president until 5 April 2019.

Citations

References 
 

1935 births
Living people
People from Sud-Ubangi
Candidates for President of the Democratic Republic of the Congo
Presidents of the Senate (Democratic Republic of the Congo)
Prime Ministers of the Democratic Republic of the Congo
Democratic Republic of the Congo people of Rwandan descent
Democratic Republic of the Congo people of Polish-Jewish descent
Tutsi people
Black Jewish people
Free University of Brussels (1834–1969) alumni
Jews and Judaism in the Democratic Republic of the Congo
Jewish politicians
History of the Jews in Africa
Democratic Republic of the Congo politicians
History of the Democratic Republic of the Congo
Mobutu Sese Seko
21st-century Democratic Republic of the Congo people